Harry Weltman (May 4, 1933 – May 8, 2014) was an American basketball executive.

Basketball career
Weltman served as general manager of the Spirits of St. Louis in the American Basketball Association.  He was also a co-owner of that team with Ozzie and Daniel Silna.  In the 1974–75 ABA season, the New York Nets defeated the Spirits 12 straight times, but then the Spirits beat the Nets 4 games to 1 in the 1975 Eastern Division Semifinals, a major upset.

Weltman later served as general manager of the Cleveland Cavaliers of the National Basketball Association.

On September 26, 2013, Weltman was inducted into the Greater Cleveland Sports Hall of Fame.

Personal life
Weltman was a Cleveland native from a Jewish family. He and his wife Arlene had two children, Jeff and Mandy. Jeff followed in his father's footsteps into the NBA, where he is currently the president of the Orlando Magic.

Weltman died on May 8, 2014, from complications from Alzheimer's four days after his 81st birthday.

References

External links
 Cleveland Sports Hall of Fame bio

1933 births
2014 deaths
American men's basketball players
Baldwin Wallace Yellow Jackets baseball players
Baldwin Wallace Yellow Jackets football players
Baldwin Wallace Yellow Jackets men's basketball players
Cleveland Cavaliers executives
National Basketball Association general managers
New Jersey Nets executives
Spirits of St. Louis executives
Basketball players from Cleveland
Baseball players from Cleveland
Players of American football from Cleveland